Keywest are an Irish pop folk band formed in Dublin, consisting of Andrew Kavanagh (lead vocals, harmonica), Andrew Glover (acoustic guitar, piano, backing vocals), Luke Murphy (electric guitar, backing vocals), and Conor Ray (drums, percussion). They are signed to Marshall Records in Europe, and Eleven Seven Records in America, and are widely known for their rise from the street busking scene to the mainstream music industry.

History
Andrew Kavanagh and Andrew Glover are childhood friends who grew up in Artane, Dublin. Harry Sullivan and James Lock were also friends who grew up in London, England, and moved to Ireland in 2011 as full-time members of the band.

After the English members had joined the Irish, the band began their journey. Starting off by busking on the streets of Galway, Ireland, they cut their teeth singing cover songs in their own style while working hard to write their own material.

They soon had amassed enough original songs and enough street experience to start busking in Grafton Street, Dublin. This was where they forged their reputation in Ireland, gaining notable radio plays and selling out theatre shows, all while still performing on the street.

After breaking through the Irish mainstream media, Keywest began their show on the road, performing on streets around the UK, Europe, and America, quickly building a modest but enthusiastic fan base everywhere they went.

Having achieved over 20 million streams online, the band caught the attention of numerous record labels in 2018. They signed with Marshall Records in late 2018, subsequently linking with Eleven Seven Records for all things US.

2012: The Message
The band released their debut album The Message through the Irish indie label Alphastar Records. The album peaked at No.15 on the Irish charts and No.2 on the iTunes chart. It was self-produced and engineered by Mark Needham, whose credits include The Killers, Katy Perry, Fleetwood Mac, Neon Trees, and Dan Frampton (The Script).

The album was a double CD debut release for the band, with CD1 being the main album and CD2 being the Undelivered EP, which showcases the band's acoustic side.

The Message featured the singles "Back Into Your Arms", "Feels So Cruel", "In the Fight for Love" and "Straight Through My Heart". The singles did very well on Irish radio and soon earned Keywest the title of Ireland's most played Irish independent artist of 2012.

The Message is now a triple-platinum selling album in Ireland.

In 2012 Keywest was Nominated for Best New Act at the Meteor Awards and The Message (Keywest's debut album) was nominated for Best Debut Album in the Hot Press Hotties Awards.

2012 also saw the band sign a worldwide publishing deal in Los Angeles with publishing giants Peermusic.

2013: Electric Love EP
The band followed up their debut album with the Electric Love EP, which featured the title track and single "Electric Love".

Electric Love went straight to number one in the Irish charts and was released independently through the band's own label "Sonic Realm" records.

2015: Joyland
Keywest released their second album Joyland on 25 September 2015 which went straight in at number 2 on the Official Irish Chart. It climbed to the top spot the following week, going to Number 1. This was the same week that they appeared on the front cover of Ireland's biggest music magazine, Hot Press.

Joyland was very popular in Ireland, containing the singles "All My Mistakes", "Carousel", "This Is Heartbreak" and "Apple Tree Hill".

2014 and 2015 saw the band win the 98 FM award for Dublin's best street artist and in 2015 the band won the Hot Press Hotties award for Ireland's most promising artist.

2018: True North
The band's third album, titled True North, was released on 30 March 2018. It entered the Irish charts as number 3, reaching number 1 on the Independent Music Chart.

Keywest earned three nominations at the 2018 Irish Post Music Awards for Best Song, Best Album, and Best Band.

Current members
 Andrew Kavanagh – lead vocals
 Luke Murphy – lead guitar, backing vocals
 Andrew Glover – rhythm guitar, piano, backing vocals
 Conor Ray – drums, percussion

Awards and nominations
 Best New Act – Meteor Awards 2012 (Nominated)
 Best Debut Album – Hot Press Hotties Awards, 2012 (Nominated)
 Best Street Act – 98 FM Best Of Dublin Awards 2014 (Winner)
 Best Street Act – 98 FM Best Of Dublin Awards 2015 (Winner)
 Most Promising Artist – Hot Press Hotties Awards 2015 (Winner)
 Best Song – Irish Post Music Awards 2018 (Nominated)
 Best Album – Irish Post Music Awards 2018 (Nominated)
 Best Act – Irish Post Music Awards 2018 (Nominated)

Discography

Studio albums

Singles

See also

 Music of Ireland

References

http://www.hotpress.com/Keywest/news/Keywest-grace-the-cover-of-new-Hot-Press/15382572.html

External links
 

Musical groups established in 2008
Irish pop music groups
Musical groups from Dublin (city)